The Sandy Co-op Block, located at 8750 South Center St. (150 East), in Sandy, Utah, was built in 1889 and was originally a ZCMI shop. Known later as Sandy Museum, it was listed on the National Register of Historic Places in 1992.

Its 1992 NRHP nomination asserted it is important "as a distinct and important type of commercial structure which was common in Sandy City in the latter half of the nineteenth century. This structure is the only remaining two-story commercial block from Sandy's original commercial district."  It is associated with the mining, smelting, and small farm era of Sandy.  Sandy had been connected by railroad in 1871.

References

External links

 Sandy Museum

Commercial buildings on the National Register of Historic Places in Utah
Georgian architecture in Utah
Buildings and structures completed in 1889
Buildings and structures in Sandy, Utah
Museums in Salt Lake County, Utah
History museums in Utah
National Register of Historic Places in Salt Lake County, Utah
1889 establishments in Utah Territory